Glenfaba is one of the six sheadings of the Isle of Man.

It is located on the west of the island (part of the traditional North Side division) and consists of the two historic parishes of German and Patrick. Historically, from 1796 until some time in the twentieth century (1986) it also included the parish of Marown.

Geographically, the sheading of Glenfaba also includes the town of Peel.

Other settlements in the sheading include St John's in the parish of German (home of the Tynwald Day ceremony), and Dalby, Foxdale, Glen Maye and Niarbyl (all in the parish of Patrick).

Etymology

The first mention of Glenfaba may be in a bull of Pope Gregory IX in 1231. The origin of the name is not known, but may be connected with that of the river Neb.

MHKs and elections 
Until 2016, Glenfaba was also a House of Keys constituency, electing one MHK. From 2016 it is part of the Glenfaba & Peel constituency.

In 2016 the constituency was abolished.

See also
Local government in the Isle of Man

References

External links
Constituency maps and general election results

Sheadings of the Isle of Man
Constituencies of the Isle of Man